"The Virgin" is the 50th episode of the sitcom Seinfeld. It was the tenth episode of the fourth season. It aired on November 11, 1992. The cast assembled to read this episode's script on October 14, 1992, and it was filmed six days later, on October 20. In this episode, Jerry's current relationship runs into trouble after his girlfriend confides in him that she is a virgin, and he and George struggle to come with episode ideas for the Jerry show in the last few days before they must pitch the show to NBC executives.

Plot
After a month and a half of procrastinating on a television pilot idea, Jerry is nervous about the series' fate, while George remains indifferent. Jerry introduces Marla, his new girlfriend, who is a virgin.

George asks out a woman named Stacy. He knows he cannot keep this relationship up, though, as he is dating Susan. George finds himself in a dilemma: this is the first time he has something good to say when asked "What do you do?" ("television writer"), but he cannot use this title to pick up women because of Susan. However, if he breaks up with Susan to see other women, he will wind up losing his job title, since Susan is one of the executives of NBC. Jerry is amused by the irony of this situation.

Elaine talks colorfully about the diaphragm she carries around while Marla is in the room, unaware of Marla's virginity. Later, when Jerry informs her of this, she fears that she offended Marla and goes to talk to her. She then educates Marla on the "normal behavior" of men after having sex. This makes Marla hesitant to have sex with Jerry.

George comes up with an idea for the pilot, involving a man being forced into becoming a butler after a set of insurance-related circumstances. Meanwhile, Elaine becomes the indirect cause of a biking accident that delivery boy Ping has.

Jerry pitches the butler idea to the NBC executives, getting much unexpected approval; during the meeting, George inadvertently gets Susan fired by kissing her in front of NBC executive Rita. She breaks up with him, but George finds that he still cannot pick up women, most of whom view the role of sitcom writer as unprestigious.

Production
"The Virgin" was written by Peter Mehlman, and co-written by the Farrelly brothers, who went on to write and direct such comedies as Dumb and Dumber, There's Something About Mary, Shallow Hal, and Stuck on You. This episode introduced the character Marla. She also appears in the next episode, "The Contest", and has cameos in "The Pilot" and "The Finale". Jackie Swanson and Dedee Pfeiffer were additional actresses who auditioned for the role.

In the episode, Jerry pitches the idea of an episode where all the main characters are doing is waiting for a table in a Chinese restaurant. This is an inside joke, pertaining to when Jerry Seinfeld and Larry David proposed season two's "The Chinese Restaurant". This left the real-life executives of NBC indifferent, as was the case when the idea was proposed in this episode. Bob Balaban (who plays Russell Dalrymple) was supposed to appear in this scene, but the role was written out due to a scheduling conflict. It is explained in the episode that Russell had to deal with "a problem on the set of Blossom."

The scene when George says "every time I think I'm out, they pull me back in!" is the same line spoken by Michael Corleone in The Godfather Part III.

Reception
Over 16 million people viewed this episode. It gained an 11.6 Nielsen Rating and a 17 audience share, meaning that 11.6% of American households watched the episode, and 17% of all televisions in use at the time were tuned into it.

References

External links

 

1992 American television episodes
Seinfeld (season 4) episodes
Virginity in television